The Colombo Centre (Centro Colombo in Portuguese) is a shopping mall located in the parish of Carnide in Lisbon and attracts many visitors. It is situated next to the Lusíada avenue and the Segunda Circular; there is a bus terminal next to the building and the Lisbon Metro station Colégio Militar/Luz allows visitors easy access to Colombo.

History
It opened on 15 September 1997.

The architecture of the space, as well as its original decoration, was themed to the Age of Discovery, one of the most important periods in the history of Portugal. The squares and hallways inside the mall have names alluding to the Elizabethan era, such as "Avenue of the Discoveries" and "Square Tropic of Cancer". From 2007 and 2009, the mall renovated its interior design completely, mixing contemporary concepts with the originals.

This mall has been designed with environmental concerns in mind, therefore it has implemented several policies towards energy saving, waste recycling and others.

Shops
It has shoe shining, clothing stores, food stores, stationery stores, a chapel, and a supermarket. Additionally there are 9 cinema screens, a bowling alley, an outdoor garden and over 60 restaurants. It is the biggest shopping mall of the Iberian Peninsula by total number of stores. It has more stores than any other shopping mall in Portugal, having stores as Fnac, Zara, Sport Zone, Adidas Originals and the largest Primark store in Portugal.

The mall has 119 725 m2 and 340 stores.

The Towers of Colombo, which were seen in the initial project as an integral part of the Centro Colombo, were only started in 2007 due to an embargo by the Lisbon city council, which was ultimately decided in court. "Torre Oriente" (East Tower) was finished first and "Torre Ocidente" (West Tower) finished in 2011.

References

External links 
Official site of Colombo Centre

Shopping centers in Portugal
Buildings and structures completed in 1997
Colombo Centre
1997 establishments in Portugal